The Manor MRT05 is a Formula One racing car designed by Manor Racing for use in the 2016 Formula One season.

Drivers 
Ahead of the season, Pascal Wehrlein and Rio Haryanto were announced as the 2016 race team drivers.  Ahead of the Belgian Grand Prix, Esteban Ocon replaced Haryanto. Alexander Rossi and Jordan King were test and development drivers.

Design and development 
The MRT05 was launched at the Circuit de Catalunya in Barcelona on 22 February 2016 in pre-season testing. It was the first new car for Manor since 2014, as the MRT04 had been a development of the previous years car.  The MRT05 featured Mercedes AMG engines in a change from Ferrari. The team developing the car had changed significantly, with Dave Ryan (McLaren Racing), Pat Fry (Scuderia Ferrari) and Nikolas Tombazis (Scuderia Ferrari) joining the technical team developing the MRT05. The MRT05 was designed largely from scratch as the team had lost their wind tunnel model, the MRN1, when the team collapsed at the end of 2014 and their original factory and wind tunnel were occupied by the new Haas F1 Team.

During the eight day pre season test in Spain, the MRT05 ran a total of 484 laps/2253km.  Wehrlein's aggregate times placed him 19th fastest, whilst Haryanto was last in 23rd 3.31 seconds off the fastest pace.

Racing history 
During the first race of the season in Australia, Rio Haryanto retired due to a drivetrain problem, while Pascal Wehrlein finished in sixteenth place. At the next race, in Bahrain, Wehrlein was one place away from reaching Q2 for the first time in his career, qualifying sixteenth. Haryanto finished the race, a career first, in 17th place.

Wehrlein also scored the team's first ever point and its best result to date by finishing 10th in the race.

Before the 2016 Belgian Grand Prix, Rio Haryanto was demoted to reserve driver, and with it sponsor Pertamina withdrew support from the team. For the remaining nine races of the season, he was replaced by Esteban Ocon.

At the end of a Brazilian Grand Prix, which was held in adverse conditions, Sauber gained two points, putting them ahead of Manor in the championship, costing the team £30 million in prize money. At the final round of the season at Abu Dhabi, the team did not score points and therefore finished 11th and last in the Constructors Championship. This lack of prize money would ultimately lead the team to administration and closure in January 2017, therefore making the MRT05 the final Manor F1 car that raced.

Livery and sponsorship 

For 2016, the Manor team had a predominantly red and blue livery with flashes of white. Pertamina were the dominant sponsor, with logos on the nose and rear wing of the car – until their support was withdrawn during the season. Shazam backed the team and had branding on the rear wing end plates. Daffy's Gin sponsored the team ahead of the Australian Grand Prix. In May, Airbnb returned to sponsorship of the team and ahead of the final race of the year, Deliveroo joined as sponsors.

Complete Formula One results 
(key) (results in bold indicate pole position; results in italics indicate fastest lap)

References 

Formula One cars